Johann Friedrich Turley (23 June 1804 – 1855 "not far from Köthen") was a German organ builder, who worked in Brandenburg in the first half of the 19th century.

Life 
Born in Treuenbrietzen, Turley learned organ building from his father Johann Tobias Turley and was his collaborator in the last years of his life. Several new organs were built by the two of them together. After his father's death, he took over the workshop and moved with the company to Brandenburg, where he worked together with his half-brother Albert Turley after 1844. He bore the title "Königlich-Preußischer Orgelbaumeister". On 28 December 1827, he married Theresia Meyer from Wendhausen, from whom he divorced before 1844.

Work (selection) 
Several new organs by Johann Friedrich Turley are known - most of them in the western Mark Brandenburg. Characteristic since the 1830s are the "coreless lingual pipes" with deeply seated cores and the ivory mouthpieces on tongue pipes.
Some instruments have survived. Instruments that are no longer extant are set in italics.

New organ buildings

Other works

Pupils 
Turley passed on his knowledge to his half-brother Albert Turley. From 1830 to 1833, he taught Friedrich Hermann Lütkemüller. Gottfried Wilhelm Baer was also presumably active with him.

References

Further reading 
 Wolf Bergelt: Die Mark Brandenburg: Eine wiederentdeckte Orgellandschaft. Pape, Munich 1988, 
 Arthur Jaenicke: Tobias Thurley bäckt Semmeln und baut Orgeln. Berlin 1960 (biographical novel).

German pipe organ builders
1804 births
1855 deaths
People from Treuenbrietzen